Manfred Kersch (19 September 1913 – 2 May 1995) was a German athlete who competed in the 1936 Summer Olympics.

References

1913 births
1995 deaths
Sportspeople from Frankfurt
German male sprinters
Olympic athletes of Germany
Athletes (track and field) at the 1936 Summer Olympics
European Athletics Championships medalists
Eintracht Frankfurt athletes